Giant from the Unknown (working titles Giant from Devil's Crag and The Diablo Giant ) is a 1958 independently made American black-and-white science fiction-horror film drama, produced by Marc Frederic and Arthur A. Jacobs, directed by Richard Cunha, that stars Ed Kemmer, Sally Fraser, and Buddy Baer. The film was theatrically released by Astor Pictures in March, 1958 as a double feature with She Demons.

Plot
The citizens of mountain town Pine Ridge, California, are concerned about a series of livestock mutilations in nearby Devil's Crag. A local, Harold Banks, is also found dead there, killed in the same manner as the livestock. Sheriff Parker orders everyone to stay away. Local speculation is that the deaths are supernatural in origin. Native American, "Indian Joe", confirms their fears of a tribal curse, but is driven out of town by the sheriff.

Local geologist Wayne Brooks is told of Banks' death by friends Anne and Charlie Brown, two Pine Ridge siblings. Sheriff Parker is suspicious of Brooks, having heard about a recent confrontation between Brooks and Banks. As the sheriff is questioning him, Dr. Cleveland and his daughter Janet arrive in town. Cleveland is planning to do archaeological research in the area. While Brooks helps Janet pick up supplies, Parker warns Cleveland about the Banks murder. While at dinner with Cleveland and Janet, Brooks, formerly Cleveland's student, offers to be his area guide.

Brooks tells Cleveland of a local Native American legend that evil spirits will rise up in Devil's Crag. He also says that Native American artifacts have been found there and that he has them. Dr. Cleveland reveals that he is searching for the remains of a Spanish expedition that he believes reached Devil's Crag 500 years earlier. The specific group Cleveland is tracing, known as the "Diablo Brigade", split off from the main expedition and was led by a huge man named Vargas, also known as the "Diablo Giant". After dinner, Janet agrees to go on a date with Brooks after he takes Cleveland to his field laboratory.

At the laboratory, Cleveland is examining Brooks' artifacts when Janet opens a box with a small lizard inside. Brooks found it inside a rock, where it had been in a state of suspended animation for a long time. Cleveland continues examining it and the artifacts, as Indian Joe peers through a window, watching closely.

When Brooks and Janet return, Cleveland excitedly calls them inside. He pieced together broken fragments into a cross and now theorizes that the Conquistadors influenced the locals hundreds of years before. The next morning all three go to Devil's Crag, and Sheriff Parker follows them in his police car. Parker pulls up and chastises Brooks for leaving town because he knows that Devil's Crag is off limits. Cleveland produces a permit from the Commissioner of Public Lands that allows him to conduct his research. Cleveland assures Parker that they are armed and can defend themselves. Unconvinced, Sheriff Parker leaves, and the small group sets up camp.

The next day, while Brooks is examining the area, Indian Joe fires his rifle in Brooks' direction. Joe tells him that he is just hunting rabbits, but pointedly asks if they are there to rob Native American graves. Brooks assures him that they are only after Spanish artifacts, so Joe agrees to hunt elsewhere, warning Brooks that the place is evil.

Brooks returns to camp and informs Cleveland that the area is changed. He theorizes that a recent electrical storm disturbed the whole area. They begin using their metal detectors to search but without success. Janet encourages Cleveland to give up, and he agrees to stop. She uses one of the detectors and by chance detects something. The spot is excavated and a cache of Spanish artifacts, armor, weapons, and bones are found. Brooks finds a rock formation similar to the one in which the lizard was entombed and discovers the handle of a massive, still intact axe he believes belonged to the "Diablo Giant". Brooks is forced to leave because of a large electrical storm, just before the "Diablo Giant" Vargas rises from the site's detritus.

The next day, the group finds a large indentation in the ground and giant-sized armor and other artifacts. They discuss the possibility that like the lizard Vargas has been in a state of suspended animation and is still alive. Later that night, the body of the 500-year-old Vargas, revived by a lightning strike, stalks the group and eventually kills Anne Brown.

Sheriff Parker accuses and arrests Brooks for Anne's murder because a medallion (one of his excavated artifacts) was found clenched in her hand. It is later revealed that the giant Vargas is roaming the wilderness after causing another brutal death. Local men from Pine Ridge help the sheriff hunt down the giant, who is causing more damage and deaths. Brooks is eventually able to kill Vargas, forcing him to fall to a watery death from a bridge spanning a raging waterfall.

Cast
 Ed Kemmer as Wayne Brooks
 Sally Fraser as Janet Cleveland
 Buddy Baer as Vargas the Giant
 Bob Steele as Sheriff Parker
 Morris Ankrum as Dr. Frederick Cleveland
 Oliver Blake as Cafe Proprietor
 Jolene Brand as Anne Brown
 Billy Dix as Indian Joe
 Gary Crutcher as Charlie Brown
 Ned Davenport as Townsman
 Ewing Miles Brown as Townsman

Production
The make-up effects were created by Jack Pierce, known for his Universal Pictures' classic monster makeup for Boris Karloff's Frankenstein (1931), The Mummy (1932), and Lon Chaney Jr.'s The Wolf Man (1941). Baer, who played Vargas the Giant in this film, also played a giant in Jack and the Beanstalk (1952), starring Bud Abbott and Lou Costello. The film was shot in the San Bernardino National Forest.

Reception and legacy
American film director, producer, actor, and editor Joe Dante described this film on his webseries Trailers from Hell as: "The ads for "Giant' quote 'It came from another world' and today it really does, the vanished world of black-and-white double features that I for one really miss". In describing the film, critic Glenn Erickson wrote "Basically a light entertainment ‘posse western’ about a big, murderous bruiser who’s been sleeping in the woods since the 16th century, Giant from the Unknown can’t be described as brilliant or inspired," but added that "[o]n the plus side are the pleasantly silly performances," that "Richard Cunha’s direction is sound and his camerawork exceptionally good," and "Albert Glasser’s attention-getting music score is a big plus — it adds the mystery, suspense and danger that’s sometimes lacking in the visuals."

Giant from the Unknown was featured in 1996's late night TV show, "Nightmare Theater's Chill-O-Rama Horror Show".

It was also spoofed by RiffTrax on May 17, 2019.

Home media
Giant from the Unknown was first released on DVD October 24, 2000. On March 2, 2012,  the film was re-released on DVD by Image Entertainment. In 2020, Film Detective provided a Blu-ray of a restored widescreen version with audio commentary by Tom Weaver, Larry Blamire, Rick Cunha and archive recordings of Richard Cunha and producer Arthur A. Jacobs reminiscing about the movie.

See also
 List of films in the public domain in the United States

References

External links
 
 RiffTrax treatment on official YouTube channel

1958 films
1958 horror films
1950s science fiction horror films
American science fiction horror films
Astor Pictures films
Films directed by Richard E. Cunha
Films scored by Albert Glasser
Films set in California
1950s English-language films
1950s American films
1950s independent films